The Case of the 3 Sided Dream in Audio Color is an album by the jazz multi-instrumentalist Rahsaan Roland Kirk, released as a double LP, with side 4 appearing blank - although side 4 did have a hidden track, the contents of which are released as track #20 on the CD rerelease. It contains performances by Kirk with Pat Patrick, Hilton Ruiz, Richard Tee, Arthur Jenkins, Cornell Dupree, Keith Loving, Hugh McCracken, Francisco Centeno, Henry Pearson, Bill Salter, Sonny Brown, Steve Gadd, John Goldsmith, Lawrence Killian, Ralph MacDonald, and arrangements by William Eaton.

Reception
The AllMusic review by Thom Jurek states: "Excess was always the name of the game for Kirk, but so was the groove, and here on this three-sided double LP, groove is at the heart of everything... But the groove he moves through is one that is so large, so universal, deep, and serene, that it transcends all notions of commercialism versus innovation. Bottom line, even with the charming tape-recorded ramblings of his between tunes, this was his concept and it works like a voodoo charm. Here's one for the revisionists: This record jams".

Track listing 
All compositions by Rahsaan Roland Kirk except as indicated.
 "Conversation" - 0:59  
 "Bye Bye Blackbird" (Mort Dixon, Ray Henderson) - 2:43  
 "Horses (Monogram/Republic)" - 0:18  
 "High Heel Sneakers" (Robert Higginbotham) - 4:50  
 "Dream" - 0:53  
 "Echoes of Primitive Ohio and Chili Dogs" - 6:55  
 "The Entertainer (Done in the Style of the Blues)" (William Eaton, Scott Joplin) - 6:02  
 "Freaks for the Festival" - 4:01  
 "Dream" - 1:28  
 "Portrait of Those Beautiful Ladies" - 6:24  
 "Dream" - 0:59  
 "The Entertainer" (Eaton, Joplin) - 6:17  
 "Dream" - 1:05  
 "Portrait of Those Beautiful Ladies" - 7:56  
 "Dream" - 0:52  
 "Freaks for the Festival" - 5:34  
 "Sesroh" - 0:24  
 "Bye Bye Blackbird" (Dixon, Henderson) - 2:37  
 "Conversation" - 0:57  
 "Side Four" - 12:41 
 Recorded at Regent Sound Studios, NYC, May 14, 1975

Personnel 
 Roland Kirk: tenor saxophone, clarinet, flute, trumpet, arranger
 Pat Patrick: baritone saxophone
 Hilton Ruiz, Richard Tee: keyboards
 Arthur Jenkins: keyboards, arranger
 Cornell Dupree, Keith Loving, Hugh McCracken: guitar
 Francisco Centeno, Henry Pearson, Bill Salter: bass
 Sonny Brown, Steve Gadd, John Goldsmith: drums
 Lawrence Killian: congas
 Ralph MacDonald: congas, percussion
 William Eaton: arranger

References 

1975 albums
Atlantic Records albums
Rahsaan Roland Kirk albums
Albums produced by Joel Dorn